Warren Ayres (born 25 October 1965) is an Australian former cricketer. He played 46 first-class cricket matches for Victoria between 1988 and 1997.

Ayres holds the record for most career runs in the Victorian Premier Cricket competition, scoring 15,277 runs at an average of 42.43 in nineteen seasons for Melbourne and six seasons for Dandenong between 1983/84 and 2007/08.

See also
 List of Victoria first-class cricketers

References

External links
 

1965 births
Living people
Australian cricketers
Victoria cricketers
Cricketers from Melbourne
Melbourne Cricket Club cricketers